Hor was an ancient Egyptian official who was in office under Senusret I, around 1950 BC. Hor is known from a number of monuments, most of them found at Abydos, where he most likely had a chapel. He is also known from a stela found in the Wadi el-Hudi. His most important title was high steward. Other titles include  overseers of sealers and overseer of the gateway. In the function of high steward, he administrated the royal domains. He was bearing the highest ranking titles, such as Iry-pat (member of the elite) or Haty-a. Only one of his monuments is dated. That is stela Louvre C2. The monument bears the year date 9 of Senusret's I reign, providing evidence that he was in office in the first part of that king's reign.

References 

Ancient Egyptian high stewards
Officials of the Twelfth Dynasty of Egypt
Ancient Egyptian overseers of sealers